Leopoldo Burlando (1841–1915) was an Italian painter, mainly painting cityscapes and vedute.

He was born in Milan, where he trained at the Brera Academy under professor Luigi Bisi. He is known for painting vedute of Venice and Milan, and also interior perspectives of buildings such as the Certosa of Pavia and the Cathedral of Milan. He painted in oil and watercolor. Burlando was named honorary associate of the Brera Academy. He was also teacher of industrial design at the male orphanage in Milan.

References

1841 births
1915 deaths
19th-century Italian painters
Italian male painters
20th-century Italian painters
Painters from Milan
Italian landscape painters
Brera Academy alumni
19th-century Italian male artists
20th-century Italian male artists